Papua New Guinea's foreign policy reflects close ties with Australia and other traditional allies and cooperative relations with neighboring countries. Its views on international political and economic issues are generally moderate.

Papua New Guinea belongs to a variety of regional organizations, including the Asia-Pacific Economic Cooperation (APEC) forum; the ASEAN Regional Forum (ARF) (Papua New Guinea is an observer member of the ASEAN); the South Pacific Commission; the Pacific Islands Forum; the Melanesian Spearhead Group and the South Pacific Regional Environmental Program (SPREP).

Relations by country

List of countries which Papua New Guinea maintains diplomatic relations with:

Papua New Guinea and the Commonwealth of Nations

Papua New Guinea has been a member state of the Commonwealth of Nations since 1975, when it gained independence from Australia under the terms of the Australian Parliament's Papua New Guinea Independence Act 1975.

See also

 List of diplomatic missions in Papua New Guinea
 List of diplomatic missions of Papua New Guinea
 :Category: Treaties of Papua New Guinea

References

 
Papua New Guinea and the Commonwealth of Nations